Pituitary tumor-transforming 3, pseudogene is a protein that in humans is encoded by the PTTG3P gene.

References 

Human proteins